George Morrison or Morison may refer to:

Politics and government
 George W. Morrison (1809–1888), U.S. Representative from New Hampshire
 George S. Morrison (diplomat) (1830–1893), British diplomat
 George Ernest Morrison (1862–1920), Australian journalist and political adviser to China's first president
 George Morrison (British politician) (1869–1956), Liberal (then National Liberal) Member of Parliament for the Combined Scottish Universities, 1934–45
 George M. Morrison (1902–?), lawyer and political figure in Nova Scotia, Canada
 George Morrison (Northern Ireland politician) (1924–2014), member of the Vanguard Progressive Unionist Party

Military
 George Morrison (British Army officer) (1703–1799), Quartermaster-General to the Forces
 George Stephen Morrison (1919–2008), American Navy officer and father of musician Jim Morrison

Arts and entertainment
 George Pitt Morison (1861–1946), Australian painter and engraver
 Pete Morrison (George D. Morrison, 1890–1973), silent film actor
 George Morrison (artist) (1919–2000), American artist
 George Morrison (documentary maker) (born 1922), Irish filmmaker
 George Morrison (acting teacher) (1928–2014), American acting teacher and director
 Van Morrison (George Ivan Morrison, born 1945), Northern Irish singer-songwriter and musician

Sports
 George Morrison (Australian footballer) (1873–1942), Australian rules footballer
 George Morrison (footballer, born 2005)
 George Morrison (cricketer) (1915–1993), Irish cricketer and artist
 George Morrison (ice hockey) (1948–2008), National Hockey League player

Other
 George S. Morison (1842–1903), American engineer and bridge designer
 George F. Morrison (1867–1943), American electric executive
 George Austin Morrison, Scottish-American merchant, banker and industrialist

See also
 George Morrison Reid Henry (1891–1983), Sri Lankan entomologist and ornithologist